The Yucatan wren (Campylorhynchus yucatanicus) is a species of bird in the family Troglodytidae. It is endemic to Mexico. Its natural habitat is subtropical or tropical dry shrubland, and it is only found on the narrow coastal strip of the northern Yucatán Peninsula. One of the key habitats of this species is the Petenes mangroves ecoregion of the Yucatan coast. It is threatened by habitat destruction.

Description
The face is whitish with a dark eye-stripe and the crown is greyish brown. The upper parts are brown streaked with black and white and the wings are brown barred with dark brown and white. The tail is black barred with grey, with white tips to some of the outer feathers. The underparts are whitish with a dark cheek-stripe and blackish spotting and barring. The juvenile is similar in appearance to the adult but with less contrast between the upper and underparts.

Distribution and habitat
The Yucatan wren is endemic to a coastal strip of the Yucatan peninsula. It can be found in arid areas with scrub and large cacti, and also the edges of pastureland. Its breeding range is even more restricted to a strip about one kilometre wide edging the mangrove forests which fringe the coast.

Ecology
The Yucatan wren is usually seen in pairs or small family groups and forages among the foliage and on the ground. Its diet is unknown.

The Yucatan wren starts nest-building activities in April but eggs are not laid until June. The nests are globular grass structures with side-entrances, and are built a few metres off the ground in coastal scrub and the borders of the black mangrove (Avicennia germinans) forest which thrives along the coasts of the region. Clutch size averages three eggs and both parents help rear the chicks. A third adult has been observed feeding the chicks occasionally, an example of cooperative breeding.

Status
The population of the Yucatan wren is believed to be stable but its range is small, and the bird is threatened by habitat loss as the area in which it lives is developed for tourism. For these reasons, the International Union for Conservation of Nature has assessed its conservation status as a "near-threatened species". In 2010, the Yucatan wren was classified as endangered by SEMARNAT and Norma Oficial Mexicana.

References

 World Wildlife Fund. 2010. Petenes mangroves. eds. Mark McGinley, C.Michael Hogan & C. Cleveland. Encyclopedia of Earth. National Council for Science and the Environment. Washington DC

Yucatan wren
Birds of the Yucatán Peninsula
Yucatan wren
Yucatan wren
Taxonomy articles created by Polbot
Endemic birds of Mexico